Baldev Assembly constituency is one of the 403 constituencies of the Uttar Pradesh Legislative Assembly, India. It is a part of the Mathura district and one of the five assembly constituencies in the Mathura Lok Sabha constituency. First election in this assembly constituency was held in 2012 after the "Delimitation of Parliamentary and Assembly Constituencies Order, 2008" was passed and the constituency was formed in 2008. The constituency is assigned identification number 85.

Wards  / Areas
Extent of Baldev Assembly constituency is KC Raya & Raya NP of Mant Tehsil; KCs Farah, Baldev, Barauli, PCs Ladpur, Barari, Jhandipur, Garhaya Latifpur, Shahpur Farah, Mahuan, Makhdoom of Bad KC, Mahaban NP, Baldev NP, Gokul NP  & Farah NP of Mathura Tehsil.

Member of the Legislative Assembly

Election results

2022

2012

See also
Mathura district
Mathura Lok Sabha constituency
Sixteenth Legislative Assembly of Uttar Pradesh
Uttar Pradesh Legislative Assembly

References

External links
 

Assembly constituencies of Uttar Pradesh
Mathura district
Constituencies established in 2008